Holtz is the surname of:
 Alexander Holtz (born 2002), Swedish ice hockey player
 Andrew Holtz, American journalist
 Carl Holtz (1920–2006), American oarsman and farmer
 Daniel Holtz, a fictional character on the TV series Angel
 Eric Holtz (born 1965), American Head Coach of the Israel National Baseball Team
 Jürgen Holtz (1932–2020), German actor on stage and in film, artist and author
 Hyman Holtz (1896–c. 1939), American mobster
 Itshak Holtz (born 1925), Painter
 Kaila Holtz (born 1981), a 2004 Canadian Olympic softball pitcher
 Lou Holtz (1893–1980), American comedian
 Lou L. Holtz (born 1937), a retired national championship winning college football coach
 Mark Holtz (1945–1997), former broadcaster for the Texas Rangers
 Mike Holtz (born 1972), American baseball player
 Pat Holtz, Scottish pool player
 Sabine Holtz (born 1959), German historian
 Skip Holtz (born 1964), head football coach of University of South Florida
 Stefan Holtz (born 1981), German canoer
 Tenen Holtz (1877–1971), Russian actor
 Thomas R. Holtz, Jr., palaeontologist and senior lecturer in geology at University of Maryland, USA
 Viktor Holtz (1846–1919), a German educator and a pioneer of German-Japanese academic and cultural relations.
 Wilhelm Holtz (1836–1913), German physicist and inventor of the Holtz machine
 Frederick Holtz, Tigard High School IB Psychology teacher

See also

 Holz

German-language surnames
Jewish surnames